John William Tristram (7 October 1870 – 19 August 1938) was an Australian artist who painted primarily in watercolour. He commonly signed his paintings "J. W. Tristram".

Biography 
Born at Gillingham, Kent, England, Tristram  was the first of eight children to his parents Samuel Herbert Tristram and Hannah Thompson. His father was a gunnery instructor in the British Army and accepted a posting in Australia which resulted in the family's emigration. John was 13 when they arrived in Sydney on 21 December 1883.

Tristram's artistic abilities were utilised in seeking employment and by April 1885 he was accepted as a junior draftsman in the Architect’s Branch of the Department of Public Instruction (which became the Department of Education in 1915). He was to remain in this career until he retired in 1930.

On 14 October 1891 he married Maude Face at Woollahra, in Sydney's eastern suburbs. In 1899 John, Maude and their two surviving children moved north of Sydney Harbour to Mosman which, from its earliest days, had strong connections with the creative arts in Sydney. He remained a resident of Mosman until his death in 1938.

During his life Tristram was an active participant on the committees of three art societies: Art Society of New South Wales (which became the Royal Art Society of New South Wales when its Royal charter was granted in 1903), Australian Watercolour Institute and Australian Art Society.

Aside from his painting, Tristram was known as a contributor of poetry to publications such as  The Bulletin and The Lone Hand as well as being a talented musician.

J. W. Tristram died in Sydney on 19 August 1938 and was survived by his wife Maude and children Ashwin, John, Norah and Molly.

Works 

Tristram's watercolours were typically soft and delicate. He was best known for his coastal scenes and rural landscapes which were often nocturnes or low light depictions of dawn or dusk. His works can be found in the collections of many Australian public galleries including: National Gallery of Australia, Art Gallery of New South Wales, National Gallery of Victoria, Art Gallery of South Australia and Queensland Art Gallery.

Gallery

References

Further reading 

Marshall, Stephen (2014), "John William Tristram". ancestry.com.au, http://trees.ancestry.com.au/tree/51571839/person/13221461357
Marshall, Stephen (2013), "J. W. Tristram". Design and Art Australia Online,  http://www.daao.org.au/bio/john-w-tristram/biography/
McCulloch, Susan (1994), The Encyclopedia of Australian Art (Third edition). Sydney: Allen & Unwin.
Campbell, Jean (1989), Australian Watercolour Painters: 1780 to the Present Day. Sydney, Craftsman House.
(1951), A Memorial Volume to Howard Hinton Patron of Art. Sydney: Angus and Robertson.
Moore, William (1934), The Story of Australian Art. Sydney: Angus and Robertson.
Ure Smith, Sydney & Bertram Stevens (editors) (1918), The Art of J. J. Hilder. Sydney: Angus & Robertson.

People from Gillingham, Kent
1870 births
1938 deaths
19th-century Australian painters
20th-century Australian painters
Australian watercolourists